Albacete is a province of central Spain, in the southern part of the autonomous community of Castile–La Mancha. As of 2012, Albacete had a population of 402,837 people.

History
The territory occupied by the province of Albacete has been inhabited since ancient times, as evidenced by cave paintings in the Cueva del Niño and Cueva de la Vieja. In Roman times, the territory of the present province of Albacete was part of Carpetania and Celtiberia, Contestania, Bastetania and Oretania. In Roman times, the Romans built a significant settlement at Libisosa, and during the age of the Visigoths, Tolmo de Minateda grew in prominence.

During the Muslim era, territories of the province were under different zones of influence, and numerous farmhouses, castles and watchtowers developed to fight off invaders. A number of battles were held here in the Middle Ages, and on April 25, 1707, the Battle of Almansa was held in the vicinity of the town of Albacete, a major Spanish battle which culminated in the triumph of Philip V who ascended to the throne, establishing the monarchy for the House of Bourbon in Spain.

In 1822 the province of ephemeral Province of Chinchilla was created, composed of municipalities in the provinces of La Mancha, Cuenca and the Kingdom of Murcia. Its capital at Chinchilla de Monte-Aragón, very close to the city of Albacete, would be the basis on which the province of Albacete was created in 1833 as dictated by Javier de Burgos. Following the adoption of the Constitution in 1978, the province of Albacete joined the Castile-La Mancha Region from the Murcia Region, and its Statute of Autonomy was approved in 1982.

Geography
Located in the southeast of the Central Plateau with an area of 14,926 km ², the Province of Albacete is bordered by the provinces of Granada, Murcia, Alicante, Valencia, Cuenca, Ciudad Real and Jaén. The province is divided into 87 municipalities and seven judicial districts. Its seat of government is Albacete. Other important towns (with more than 10,000 inhabitants) are: Hellín, Villarrobledo, Almansa, La Roda and Caudete. The main river of the province is the Jucar river, which crosses the province in the northeast, renowned for its deep gorges and trees. The Lagunese de Ruidera flows in the west. Other rivers of note include the Cabriel on the far northeastern border, the Salobral, Navalcudi and Tajo-Segura in the central part, the Corcoles in the northwest, and the Guadalmena, Mundo, Tus, Segura. and Taibilla rivers in the south. It is also home to seasonal rivers, including Abengibre Creek.

Population
The historical population is given in the following chart:

Economy

See also
 List of municipalities in Albacete.

References

External links 

 Carnival of Villarrobledo 

 
A